Betta siamorientalis is a species of gourami. It is a freshwater fish native to Asia, where it occurs in shallow marshes, grass fields, and paddy fields in Thailand and Cambodia. It is typically found in still, vegetated environments at the water's edge and is known to use aquatic plants as shelter for building and guarding bubble nests. It is known to occur alongside the species Anabas testudineus, Lepidocephalichthys hasselti, Macrognathus siamensis, Monopterus albus, Pangio anguillaris, Trichopodus trichopterus, Trichopsis pumila, Trichopsis schalleri, and Trichopsis vittata. The species reaches 3.6 cm (1.4 inches) in standard length and is known to be a facultative air-breather.

References 

Species described in 2012
Osphronemidae
Freshwater fish of Asia
Fish of Thailand
Fish of Cambodia